

This is a list of the National Register of Historic Places listings in Logan County, Arkansas.

This is intended to be a complete list of the properties and districts on the National Register of Historic Places in Logan County, Arkansas, United States. The locations of National Register properties and districts for which the latitude and longitude coordinates are included below, may be seen in a map.

There are 44 properties and districts listed on the National Register in the county. One additional listing has been removed from the Register.

Current listings

|}

Former listings

|}

See also

List of National Historic Landmarks in Arkansas
National Register of Historic Places listings in Arkansas

References

 
Logan County